Human capital—that is, resources associated with the knowledge and skills of individuals—is a critical component of economic development. The Human Capital Index is an annual measurement prepared by the World Bank. The Index measures which countries are best in mobilizing the economic and professional potential of its citizens. The index measures how much capital each country loses through lack of education and health. The Index was first published in October 2018 and ranked 157 countries. The Human Capital Index ranges between 0 and 1, with 1 meaning maximum potential is reached.The index is used in country studies of employment and wages, for example in Ukraine after Russia's invasion.

Methodology 
The applications to measuring human capital are developed in research by Noam Angrist, Simeon Djankov, Pinelopi Koujianou Goldberg and Harry Patrinos in the leading scientific journal Nature (journal). These findings are popularized in a 2021 article. The Index is grounded on the following three pillars:

Survival

Share of children surviving past the age of 5 in %

School

Quantity of education  (Expected years of schooling by age 18)
Quality of education (Harmonized test scores)

Health

Adult survival rates (Share of 15-year-olds who survive until age 60 in %)
Healthy growth among children (Stunting rates of children under 5 in %)

Human Capital Index 
The Human Capital Index was first published as part of the World Bank's World Development Report 2019, directed by Simeon Djankov and Federica Saliola. Nobel Prize winner Paul Romer started the measurement.

See also
Human capital
World Development Report

References

External links 
Measuring Human Capital

Economics publications
International rankings
Global economic indicators